Xenisthmus clarus, better known as the clear wriggler, is a species of fish in the Xenisthmidae (wriggler) family, which is regarded as a synonymous with the Eleotridae.

References

External links
 Fishes of Australia : Xenisthmus clarus

clear wriggler
Marine fish of Northern Australia
clear wriggler
Taxa named by David Starr Jordan